Zicronapine (previously known as Lu 31-130) is an atypical antipsychotic medication formerly under development by H. Lundbeck A/S. In phase II studies zicronapine showed statistically significant separation from placebo and convincing efficacy and safety data when compared to olanzapine. 

Zicronapine exhibits monoaminergic activity and has a multi-receptorial profile. In vitro and in vivo it has shown potent antagonistic effects at dopamine D1, D2 and serotonin 5HT2A receptors.

In 2014 Lundbeck removed zicronapine from its development portfolio in favor of pursuing the more promising antipsychotic Lu AF35700 (a prodrug of Lu AF356152).

References

External links

Abandoned drugs
Atypical antipsychotics
1-Aminoindanes
Chloroarenes
Piperazines